José Goldemberg (born in Santo Ângelo, May 27, 1928) is a Brazilian physicist, university educator, scientific leader and research scientist. He is a leading expert on energy and environment issues.

Goldemberg earned his Ph.D. in physical science from the University of São Paulo where he served as rector and full professor from 1986 to 1989.  From 1983 to 1986 he directed the Energy Company of the State of São Paulo.  From 1990 to 1992 he served the federal government in various capacities: as the Secretary of State for Science and Technology he modernized the information systems; as interim Secretary of the Environment he administered Brazil's participation in the 1992 Earth Summit in Rio de Janeiro; and as Minister of Education he prepared the proposal to Congress resulted in autonomy for federal universities.  He has authored many technical papers and books on nuclear physics, environment, and energy and has served as president of the Brazilian Association for the Advancement of Science. Goldemberg also served as chairman of the editorial board (1998–2000) and a lead author of the UNDP World Energy Assessment.

External links 
 Biography from the website of the Sustainable Energy Institute
 Biographical information from The Environment and Development Students' Interest Group at Yale University
 Biography from the website of Academia Brasileira de Ciências

Education Ministers of Brazil
Ministers of Science and Technology of Brazil
People from Rio Grande do Sul
Living people
1928 births
Brazilian nuclear physicists
Brazilian Jews
Jewish physicists
Members of the Brazilian Academy of Sciences
Recipients of the Great Cross of the National Order of Scientific Merit (Brazil)
University of São Paulo alumni
Academic staff of the University of São Paulo
Brazilian environmentalists
People associated with energy
Presidents of the Brazilian Physical Society
Health ministers of Brazil